Gary Baze (born October 25, 1955 in Sunnyside, Washington) is an American Thoroughbred horse racing jockey. An inductee of the Washington State Racing Hall of Fame, his Hall of Fame profile says of him: "As much as anything, Baze is respected throughout the industry for his honesty, courtesy, sportsmanship and work ethic."

A member of the renowned Baze racing family, his father, Carl Albert Baze, was a trainer in Washington State for many years. In 1972, Gary Baze embarked on his career, doing his apprenticeship at the Playfair Race Course in Spokane, Washington.

Washington State's all-time leading jockey, during his career Gary Baze won a record six riding titles at Longacres Racetrack in Renton, Washington before the track closed in 1992. He retired from racing in 1996 to work for the Jockeys' Guild but returned to riding at Emerald Downs in 2000. That year, he finished 4th in the standings with 80 wins. His 351 career wins at Emerald Downs rank #10 all time. He also ranks #7 in earnings ($4,300,565) and #4 in stakes wins (26) entering the 2011 season at Emerald Downs.

In 2009, Gary Baze was a finalist for the prestigious George Woolf Memorial Jockey Award.

On April 1, 1999, Gary Baze married jockey Vicky Aragon, herself a winner of more than 1,500 races at the time.

Gary's Parents are Carl Albert (deceased) and Alice Mary Baze (Cochran).  He has four brothers; Earl T. Baze, Carl R. Baze, Michael B. Baze and Kelly L. Baze, and one sister, Toni Y. Norton (Baze).

References

Notes
 Gary Baze at the Washington Racing Hall of Fame, The consummate professional, by Kate Barton, WASHINGTON THOROUGHBRED, October 2004, page 794
 View From The Rail: Stevens, Baze were royalty in the Sport of Kings, By LARRY LEE PALMER, December 15, 2005 article on Gary Baze at the Seattle Post-Intelligencer (Hearst Seattle Media, LLC)

Living people
1955 births
Baze family
American jockeys
People from Sunnyside, Washington